Tanja Pawollek (born 18 January 1999) is a Polish footballer who plays as a midfielder for Eintracht Frankfurt and Polish national team.

Career

Clubs 
Pawollek started her club career aged 5 at TV Hausen. After 6 years at her hometown club she moved to SG Rosenhöhe where she rose through the ranks up to the boy's under 17 team. In summer 2016 she signed for a 3-year contract with Bundesliga side 1. FFC Frankfurt. After just playing a 90 minutes match 2. Frauen-Bundesliga  for the 1.FFC reserves team on 28 August 2016 against TSG Hoffenheim reserves, she debuted in the Bundesliga on 4 September 2016 against Borussia Mönchengladbach when she was subbed in for Saskia Bartusiak in the 68th minute. Pawollek scored her first Bundesliga goal on 30 April 2017 at the away match (2-2) at Bayer 04 Leverkusen. She captains the team since the 2019/20 season.

In July 2020 1. FFC Frankfurt was integrated into Eintracht Frankfurt, forming the clubs's women's football section.

International career 

Since the first call up for the under-15 national team on 30 October 2013 against Scotland, when she contributed a goal, Pawollek became a regular member for Germany's youth teams. 
In December 2018 Germany's gaffer Martina Voss-Tecklenburg called her up for Germany during the winter training camp between 14 and 21 January 2019 in Marbella, Spain.

In May 2021, Pawollek, whose parents were born in Poland, was called up to the Polish national team. However, she could not play due to an injury. In June 2022, she was called up again to the Polish team and made her debut in a friendly match against Iceland on 29 June 2022.

Notes

References

External links
 
 Tanja Pawollek - Spielerinnenprofil dfb.de 
 Tanja Pawollek soccerdonna.de

1999 births
Living people
Footballers from Hesse
German women's footballers
Polish women's footballers
Germany women's youth international footballers
Poland women's international footballers
Women's association football midfielders
1. FFC Frankfurt players
Eintracht Frankfurt (women) players
Frauen-Bundesliga players
2. Frauen-Bundesliga players
German people of Polish descent
Polish expatriate sportspeople in Germany
Expatriate women's footballers in Germany